Amietia wittei (common names: Molo frog, De Witte's river frog) is a species of frog in the family Pyxicephalidae. It is found in Kenya and Tanzania, including Mount Elgon in the Kenya/Uganda border region. Its type locality is in Molo, Kenya, located near the top of the Mau Escarpment. The specific name wittei honours Gaston-François de Witte, a Belgian naturalist.

Description
Adult males reach  and adult females  in snout–urostyle length. The dorsal ground colour is a dark brown, becoming lighter on the flanks and yellowish on to the belly. The dorsolateral folds are black, and so are many of the elongated warts on the back. A row of irregular dark blotches runs from the groin towards the tympanum. Some specimens have a pale (bright green) vertebral stripe. The upper lip is uniformly dark or marbled; a pale (coppery) band above the upper lip extends between the tympanum and eye, touching the eye. The lower lip is marbled.

Habitat and conservation
It is associated with streams and can be found in areas of low-intensity agriculture. It is suffering from some habitat loss and deterioration caused by expanding human settlements, wood collection, and logging. It occurs in several national parks: Aberdare and Mount Kenya National Parks in Kenya, Mount Elgon National Park in Kenya/Uganda, and Kilimanjaro National Park in Tanzania.

References

wittei
Frogs of Africa
Amphibians of Kenya
Amphibians of Tanzania
Amphibians of Uganda
Amphibians described in 1924
Taxa named by Fernand Angel
Taxonomy articles created by Polbot